Taroko National Park is one of the nine national parks in Taiwan and was named after the Taroko Gorge, the landmark gorge of the park carved by the Liwu River. The park spans Taichung Municipality, Nantou County, and Hualien County and is located in Xiulin Township, Hualien County, Taiwan.

History

After the Empire of Japan's defeat in World War II, the Republic of China took over Taiwan in consequence. The ROC government subsequently abolished the park on 15 August 1945. It was not until 28 November 1986 that the park was reestablished. It is located in Hualien County, Taichung City, and Nantou County, and is home to unique geological and natural resources, including twenty-seven peaks over  located in and around the Qilai and Nanhu Mountain ranges. It includes the marble gorge of Taroko, the Qingshui Cliff, the trail along the Shakadang River, and the waterfalls of the Baiyang trail.

The Central Cross-Island Highway (Provincial Highway 8) extends from Asian tropical deciduous forests to high mountain pine and cedar forests.

Origin of the name 
The name "Taroko" (太魯閣) derives from the Truku tribe, an indigenous group formally recognized by the Taiwanese government as of 2004. The Truku tribe originally resided in the upper region of the Zhuoshi river (濁水溪) before migrating eastward towards Hualien County through Mt. Qilai (Mt. Qilai: Truku language called ”Klbiyun”) to the Liwu River. The Truku tribe continues to reside in Hualien County, including within the designated National Park area.

Geology 

Taiwan was created through the collision of the Philippine and the Eurasian plates in what is known as the Penglai Orogeny. This movement occurred some four million years ago and is responsible for the formation of the Central Mountain Range that runs north-south through much of Taiwan. Even today the shift in tectonic plates continues and this area continues to rise a few millimeters every year.

Marble formations only revealed themselves after millions of years of erosion and continued uplifting. Calcium Carbonate remains accumulated some 230 million years ago. These deposits through time, pressure, and the elements were gradually lithified into the limestone that in turn metamorphosed into marble. As Taiwan was uplifted from the pressures of the colliding plates, the erosive forces of weathering and water worked to carve out the gorges we see today.

Erosion by the river against the constantly elevating land combined with the heavy sub-tropical rains resulted in a rapid transformation of the landscape. Marble, which is relatively hard and resistant to erosion, nevertheless relented to these forces resulting in the unusually steep and narrow canyons.

The gorge itself was carved into the marble by the erosive power of the Liwu River.

Sights include:
 Tunnel of Nine Turns (九曲洞 Jiuqudong) (Opened in November 2017)
 Eternal Spring Shrine
 Yenzikou, Swallow Grotto Trail (燕子口)
 Jinheng Park (靳珩公園)
 Cimu Bridge, Motherly Devotion Bridge (慈母橋)
 
 Zhuilu Cliff (錐麓斷崖)
 Liufang Bridge (流芳橋)
 Dayuling (大禹嶺)
 Buluowan (布洛灣)
 Qingshui Cliffs (清水斷崖)
 Shakadang Trail
 Changuang Temple (禪光寺) 
 Baiyang Trail (白楊步道)

Transportation
Taroko National Park is typically accessed from Hualien City where various tours, buses, and transport options are available next to the Hualien Train station. Due to Xincheng's distance from the park itself, visitors looking to get closer to the park will typically utilize the many tour buses and taxis available.

Gallery

See also
List of national parks in Taiwan

References

External links 

 
 Taroko National Park
 Photo galleries of Taroko National Park